is a railway station in Izumi, Kagoshima, Japan.

Lines 
Hisatsu Orange Railway
Hisatsu Orange Railway Line

History
The station name was changed to the present one on July 11, 1928.

Adjacent stations

References 

Railway stations in Kagoshima Prefecture
Railway stations in Japan opened in 1923
Stations of Hisatsu Orange Railway